"(Glad I'm) Not a Kennedy" is a song by New Zealand musician Shona Laing. According to Laing, the inspiration for the song was her reaction to a television appearance of American politician Edward Kennedy. The song was originally released as a single in 1985, titled "Not a Kennedy", and was included on Laing's 1985 album Genre. It was re-mixed and re-released in 1987, and this version was included on her 1987 album South. The song reached number two in New Zealand, number nine in Australia, and number 14 on the US Billboard Modern Rock Tracks chart.

Charts

Weekly charts

Year-end charts

References

External links
 "On Song with Simon Sweetman", 9 January 2013 – discussion of the origin of the song from Radio New Zealand website

1985 songs
1985 singles
1987 singles
Shona Laing songs
TVT Records singles
Virgin Records singles